Laricobius osakensis is a species of Derodontid beetle native to Japan. Described in 2011, it feeds exclusively on hemlock woolly adelgid (Adelges tsugae), an invasive insect species that is destroying huge numbers of hemlock trees in eastern North America. It has shown promise as a biological control agent in field trials.

References 

Derodontidae
Insects used as insect pest control agents
Biological pest control beetles
Beetles described in 2011
Insects of Japan